The Lebanon Valley Railroad was a railway company in the United States. It constructed the Lebanon Valley Branch between the cities of Harrisburg and Reading, both in the American state of Pennsylvania. The line opened on 18 January 1858.

The company and its line were acquired by the Philadelphia and Reading Railroad, a predecessor of the Reading Company, on 20 March 1858, which put them in direct competition with the Pennsylvania Railroad for the Philadelphia to Harrisburg route.

The line now belongs to Norfolk Southern Railway and is part of its Harrisburg Line running between Harrisburg and Philadelphia.

Passenger service
The line was the basis until the 1960s for passenger trains between Harrisburg and Jersey City, yet bypassing Philadelphia, most famously, the 'Queen of the Valley.' Intermediate stations included Lebanon, Reading, Allentown, Bethlehem, Easton, Bound Brook and Bayonne.

References 
 RSME Timetable article

 
Railway companies established in 1850
Railway companies disestablished in 1858
Defunct Pennsylvania railroads
Predecessors of the Reading Company
1850 establishments in Pennsylvania
1858 disestablishments in Pennsylvania
American companies disestablished in 1858
American companies established in 1850